Enchanted Island can refer to:

Geography
 Island of enchantment, one of the names attributed to Puerto Rico
 Enchanted Island Amusement Park, a park in Phoenix, Arizona

Literature, theatre and film
The Tempest, or The Enchanted Island, a play by John Dryden based on Shakespeare's The Tempest
The Enchanted Island, an opera setting of Dryden's play commissioned from various composers by Thomas Shadwell
 The Enchanted Island (opera), a Baroque pasticcio performed by the Metropolitan Opera in 2011–2012
The Encantadas, or Enchanted Isles, a novella by Herman Melville whose title refers to another name for the Galapagos Islands
 Enchanted Island (film), a 1958 film starring Dana Andrews
 The Enchanted Island of Yew, a 1903 novel by L. Frank Baum
 The Enchanted Island of Oz, a 1976 novel by Ruth Plumly Thompson
 The Enchanted Isles, an archipelago in J. R. R. Tolkien's fictional world of Middle-earth

Music
 Enchanted Island (song), written by Al Stillman and Robert Allen, popularized by The Four Lads in 1958
 L'Île Enchantée, an 1864 ballet by Arthur Sullivan

See also
Enchanted Isle, another name for Tahiti Drink